Thomas Joseph Cooke (August 22, 1885 – July 15, 1964) was an American amateur soccer player who competed in the 1904 Summer Olympics.He was born in St. Louis, Missouri and died in Denver, Colorado.

In 1904 he was a member of the St. Rose Parish team, which won the bronze medal in the soccer tournament. He played one match as a forward. He broke his leg during the first game with Galt F.C. and was replaced with Johnson in a later three games. His older brother George was also member of a bronze medal team.

References

External links
Thomas Cooke's profile at databaseOlympics
Thomas Cooke's profile at Sports Reference.com

1885 births
1964 deaths
Sportspeople from New Rochelle, New York
American soccer players
Footballers at the 1904 Summer Olympics
Olympic bronze medalists for the United States in soccer
Soccer players from St. Louis
Medalists at the 1904 Summer Olympics
Association football forwards